Mvuzi is a commune of the city of Matadi in the Democratic Republic of the Congo.

Matadi
Communes of the Democratic Republic of the Congo